Wilmar Romano 'Boetie' Groenewald (born 30 April 1990 in Mossel Bay, South Africa) is a South African rugby union player for the  in the Rugby Challenge. His regular position is flanker.

Career

He played high school rugby for Hoërskool Hentie Cilliers in Virginia. Despite still being in the Under-17 age group, he also represented the s in the Under-19 Provincial Championship later in that year. He again played Craven Week rugby at the 2008 tournament in Pretoria and he also played in the Under-19 Provincial Championship in 2008, as well as in 2009.

In 2010, he was included in the  senior squad for the 2010 Vodacom Cup competition. In the second half of the year, he made seven starts for the  side during the 2010 Under-21 Provincial Championship.

That was his only involvement and he reverted to the  side to play in the 2011 Under-21 Provincial Championship, starting all six of their matches and scoring two tries.

He failed to make any appearances during the 2012 Vodacom Cup, but returned to action in time for the 2012 Currie Cup First Division.

Groenewald scored his first career try 12 minutes into the match and followed it up with another one on the 57-minute mark, helping the Griffons to a 50–35 victory. However, that was one of just three victories during the campaign as they finished sixth in the eight-team competition.

He then played for the side in the 2014 Currie Cup qualification series, with a spot in the 2014 Currie Cup Premier Division up for grabs for the winner. Groenewald made three appearances as the Griffons finished third to earn a spot in the 2014 Currie Cup First Division. He made just one appearance in the competition, in which the Griffons reached the final, where they beat the  23–21 to win their first trophy for six years.

References

South African rugby union players
Living people
1990 births
People from Mossel Bay
Rugby union flankers
Griffons (rugby union) players
Rugby union players from the Western Cape